The Montenegro men's national basketball team represents Montenegro in international basketball tournaments. The supervising body is the Basketball Federation of Montenegro.

Montenegro joined FIBA in 2006, following the restoration of Montenegrin independence in the same year. Since 2006, the national team has qualified for EuroBasket on four occasions (2011, 2013, 2017, 2022). Montenegro also qualified for their first appearance to the FIBA World Cup in 2019. The team has also taken part in smaller tournaments such as the Games of the Small States of Europe.

History

2006–2014

In 2006, the Basketball Federation of Montenegro along with this team joined the International Basketball Federation (FIBA) on its own following the Independence of Montenegro.

The Montenegrin national team entered international competition in 2008, and appointed Duško Vujošević as the national coach. Montenegro started from FIBA Division B, where they won first place in their first competitive season. Since becoming a separate team, Montenegro has won 13 official games in a row, until losing to Israel in August 2010.

At that time, NBA players like Nikola Vučević and Nikola Peković became the most known players of Montenegrin national team.

In their first qualifiers for EuroBasket, Montenegro finished first in the group. So, the team qualified for Eurobasket 2011, where they played five games in the first phase - with one win and four losses. The Coach of Montenegro at their first-ever EuroBasket was Dejan Radonjić.

In August 2012, with the new coach Luka Pavićević, Montenegro started qualifiers for Eurobasket 2013. Again, they won first place, but without any defeat from 10 matches. Notable matches were against Serbia, first after the two countries separated. Montenegro won both games, and victory in Belgrade (73:71), in front of 18,000 spectators, is gained by Nikola Ivanović three-point shot from the center, one second before the end of the match.

As the first-place team in qualifiers, Montenegro participated at Eurobasket 2013 in Slovenia. They made better results than 2011, with two wins and three defeats, but that was not enough for the second phase of EuroBasket.

First unsuccessful qualifying campaign since independence, Montenegro had during the 2014. Surprisingly, group stage at the EuroBasket 2015 qualification, Montenegro finished third, so they failed to qualify for the final tournament.

2015–present

In 2015, Montenegro named Bogdan Tanjević new head coach of the national team. Prior to taking the reigns of the national team, he was the head coach of Fenerbahçe. As the national team earlier failed to qualify for EuroBasket 2015, they participated in the Games of the Small States of Europe (European countries with less than a million citizens) in Iceland and easily won the gold medal.

In summer 2016, Montenegro started competition in EuroBasket 2017 qualifiers, with the only ambition to qualify for their third final tournament since independence. In a group with Georgia, Slovakia and Albania, Montenegro finished as a second-place team, with one defeat, and qualified for EuroBasket 2017.

For the first time in their history, in Eurobasket 2017, Montenegro finished as a third-place team in the group stage and qualified to the knockout stage. At that time, that was the biggest success of the Montenegrin national team since its independence in 2006. Two years later, Montenegro qualified for the 2019 FIBA World Cup for the first time, after a winner-take-all game in Podgorica against Latvia. Montenegro lost the game 80-74 but still went through as they had won the away game 84–75, thus holding the tiebreaker on points difference. With that result, Montenegro became the smallest state by population and territory to qualify for the FIBA World Cup since the establishing of competition.

Competitive record

Montenegro made their first appearance at the FIBA World Cup in 2019. The national team has also appeared four times at the EuroBasket (2011, 2013, 2017, 2022). Among the other competitions, as a country with less than a million inhabitants, Montenegro participated at the Games of the Small States of Europe winning the gold medal in 2015 and 2019.

FIBA World Cup

Games of the Small States of Europe

EuroBasket

Results and fixtures

2021

2022

2023

Team

Current roster
Roster for 2023 World Cup Qualifiers matches on 23 and 26 February 2023 against Bosnia and Herzegovina and Czech Republic.

Depth chart

Head coaches
Since independence, all head coaches were Montenegrin-born. The first head coach of Montenegro was Duško Vujošević. With him, Montenegro won the FIBA B division championship (2009). From 2010 to 2012, Montenegro was coached by Dejan Radonjić, who led the national team to their first EuroBasket (2011). At their next Eurobasket participation (2013), Montenegro was led by Luka Pavićević. From 2015 to 2017, the head coach of Montenegro was Bogdan Tanjević, who led Montenegro to their first-ever Second phase games at the Eurobasket (2016). After that tournament, the Basketball Federation of Montenegro named Zvezdan Mitrović new head coach of the national team. During his mandate, Montenegro for the first time qualified for the World Cup (2019), as the smallest state to ever play at the global tournament.

Notable former players

Past rosters
2011 EuroBasket: finished 21st among 24 teams

4 Nikola Vučević, 5 Goran Jeretin, 6 Boris Bakić, 7 Vlado Šćepanović, 8 Miloš Borisov, 9 Vladimir Mihailović, 10 Omar Cook,11 Slavko Vraneš, 12 Milko Bjelica, 13 Vladimir Dragičević, 14 Nikola Peković, 15 Vladimir Dašić (Coach:  Dejan Radonjić)

2013 EuroBasket: finished 17th among 24 teams

4 Nikola Vučević, 5 Bojan Bakić, 6 Suad Šehović, 7 Aleksa Popović, 8 Sead Šehović, 9 Blagota Sekulić, 10 Nikola Ivanović,11 Milko Bjelica, 12 Tyrese Rice, 13 Marko Popović, 14 Bojan Dubljević, 15 Vladimir Dašić (Coach:  Luka Pavićević)

2017 EuroBasket: finished 13th among 24 teams

2 Tyrese Rice, 4 Nikola Vučević, 6 Suad Šehović, 7 Nikola Pavličević, 8 Dino Radončić, 11 Marko Todorović, 14 Bojan Dubljević,15 Filip Barović, 17 Vladimir Mihailović, 20 Nikola Ivanović, 21 Nemanja Vranješ, 22 Nemanja Đurišić (Coach:  Bogdan Tanjević)

2019 FIBA World Cup: finished 25th among 32 teams

4 Nikola Vučević, 5 Derek Needham, 6 Suad Šehović, 7 Nemanja Radović, 8 Sead Šehović, 10 Aleksa Popović, 11 Marko Todorović,14 Bojan Dubljević, 20 Nikola Ivanović, 23 Dino Radončić, 30 Petar Popović, 51 Milko Bjelica (Coach:  Zvezdan Mitrović)

2022 EuroBasket: finished 13th among 24 teams

0 Zoran Vučeljić, 2 Aleksa Ilić, 3 Vladimir Mihailović, 4 Nikola Pavličević, 8 Dino Radončić, 9 Marko Simonović, 11 Nemanja Radović,14 Bojan Dubljević (C), 19 Zoran Nikolić, 22 Igor Drobnjak, 30 Petar Popović, 55 Kendrick Perry (Coach:  Boško Radović)

Records
Largest home victory 102-58,  – , 26 August 2009, Podgorica
Largest away victory 37-100,  – , 2 June 2017, Serravalle
Largest home defeat 65-80,  – , 20 August 2014, Podgorica
Largest away defeat 99-60,  – , 1 September 2017, Cluj-Napoca
Longest winning streak 13 matches, (6 September 2008 - 14 August 2010)
Longest losing streak 4 matches, (1 September 2011 - 5 September 2011; 1 September 2019 - 9 September 2019)
Most scored points in a match 113,  –  73-113
Least scored points in a match 55,  –  71–55,  –  68-55
Most conceded points in a match 100,  –  100-68
Least conceded points in a match 37,  –  37-100
Highest home attendance 5,500,  –  72–62, 2 September 2012, Podgorica
Highest away attendance 18,000,  –  71–73, 18 August 2012, Belgrade

Head to head record

Below is the list of official performances of the Montenegro national basketball team against every single opponent.

Last updated: 26 February 2023

Kit

Manufacturer
  Kappa (2008–2011)
  Peak (2011–2023)
  Dhika (2023–present)

Sponsor
  VOLI (2008–2011)
  diva (2012–2014)
  EPCG (2014–2015)
  m:tel (2015–present)

See also

Sport in Montenegro
Montenegro women's national basketball team
Montenegro men's national under-20 basketball team
Montenegro men's national under-18 basketball team
Montenegro men's national under-17 basketball team
Montenegrin Basketball League

References

External links

 
Montenegro FIBA profile 
Montenegro National Team – Men at Eurobasket.com

 
Men's national basketball teams
 
2006 establishments in Montenegro